Austin Creek State Recreation Area is a state park unit of California, United States, encompassing an isolated wilderness area. It is located in Sonoma County, California, adjacent to Armstrong Redwoods State Natural Reserve, with which it shares a common entrance. Its rugged topography includes ravines, grassy hillsides, oak-capped knolls, and rocky summits offering glimpses of the Pacific Ocean. The remains of Pond Farm artists' colony (dating from the 1940s) are also included in the Austin Creek SRA.

Ecology
The area's 
include open woodlands, rolling hills, and meadows which contrast sharply with dense redwood forests below.

Wildflowers of the area include Douglas irises, Indian paintbrushes, buttercups, lupins, cluster-lilies, California poppies and shooting stars. Trout, salmon, newts and salamanders inhabit the area's streams, and Bullfrog Pond hosts sunfish, black bass, and bullfrogs. Birds such as wild turkeys, wood ducks, spotted owls, great blue herons, ravens, white-tailed kites, California quail, woodpeckers, hawks, and tyrant-flycatchers are seen there. Native mammals include squirrels, deer, raccoons, foxes, coyotes, skunks, bobcats, black bears, and mountain lions.  Feral pigs have also been reported.

Proposed for closure
Austin Creek State Recreation Area was one of 70 California state parks proposed for closure in July 2012 as part of a deficit reduction program. It was previously one of 48 state parks threatened with closure in 2008 by California's Governor Arnold Schwarzenegger

In September 2012, California State Parks gave Stewards of the Coast and Redwoods, a non-profit, permission to run the recreation area.

See also
 Austin Creek
 List of California state parks

References

External links
 

California State Recreation Areas
Campgrounds in California
Parks in Sonoma County, California
Protected areas established in 1964
1964 establishments in California